Sardinas Airport  is an airport serving one of the many oil production facilities in the Casanare Department of Colombia.

See also

Transport in Colombia
List of airports in Colombia

References

External links
OpenStreetMap - Sardinas
FallingRain - Sardinas Airport

Airports in Colombia